Tömöriin Battör (born 10 February 1954) is a Mongolian boxer. He competed in the men's welterweight event at the 1980 Summer Olympics. At the 1980 Summer Olympics, he lost to Peter Talanti of Zambia.

References

1954 births
Living people
Mongolian male boxers
Olympic boxers of Mongolia
Boxers at the 1980 Summer Olympics
Place of birth missing (living people)
Welterweight boxers
20th-century Mongolian people